Acentrella nadineae is a species of small minnow mayfly in the family Baetidae. It is found in the eastern United States.

References

Further reading

External links

 

Mayflies
Articles created by Qbugbot
Insects described in 2009